Sabrina Jones (born on October 6th, 1960, in Philadelphia, Pennsylvania) is an American painter and comic book artist, writer, illustrator, and editor. In addition to her own graphic novels, she is associated with artist/activist collectives such as Carnival Knowledge and underground comics such as GirlTalk and World War 3 Illustrated.

Biography
Born and raised in Philadelphia, Jones moved to New York City to study painting at Pratt Institute. She began writing and illustrating comics in the 1980s, inspired by the societal tumult of the Reagan era and the revived conservative focus on repealing abortion and other reproductive rights. She joined a group of pro-choice activist artists called Carnival Knowledge. World War 3 Illustrated co-founder Seth Tobocman convinced Jones to create her first comic strip for the magazine. She went on to edit and contribute to many issues of World War 3 Illustrated, including "Bitchcraft," "Female Complaints," and "Life During Wartime." 

In the mid-1990s Jones co-founded (with Isabella Bannerman and Ann Decker) Girltalk, a four-issue comics anthology of women's autobiographical comics published by Fantagraphics. In 1997, GirlTalk was nominated for "Lulu of the Year" by Friends of Lulu (losing out to The Great Women Superheroes, by Trina Robbins). 

In 2002, Jones' work was included in the exhibition "She Draws Comics: Trina Robbins and 27 Women Cartoonists", curated by Trina Robbins, shown at the Secession Gallery, Vienna, Austria; the exhibition toured to the Museum of Comic and Cartoon Art (New York City) in 2006.

Jones created her first historical comics for Wobblies! A Graphic History of the Industrial Workers of the World, published by Verso Books in 2005. Her work on The Real Cost of Prisons Comix inspired her to create Mixed Signals, a counter-recruitment tool in comic book form. Her first long-form graphic novel was Isadora Duncan: a Graphic Biography, published in 2008 by Hill & Wang.
 
2010 saw one of Jones' first collaborations with a writer — Paul Buhle. Buhle wrote the text for FDR and the New Deal for Beginners, which was illustrated entirely by Jones. The mixture of a graphic novel and a history book by Buhle and Jones was the latest in the long line of For Beginners books. Jones' artwork was noted by one reviewer for its "thick, darkened contours . . . – like film noir invaded by grainy newsreel footage in a Brechtian landscape."

In 2013 Jones wrote and drew Race to Incarcerate: A Graphic Retelling, an adaptation of Marc Mauer's book on America's exploding imprisonment rate.

In 2016, Soft Skull Press published Jones' graphic novel Our Lady of Birth Control: A Cartoonist's Encounter with Margaret Sanger, which told Sanger's biography through the lens of Jones' own experiences during the sexual revolution.

In addition to being a fine art painter, Jones has worked consistently as a scenic artist since 1990, painting scenery for film, theater, and television. In 1994, as a new member of United Scenic Artists Local 829 Jones began weekly work for Saturday Night Live's broadcasts, a practice that continues to this day.

Jones was awarded MacDowell residences in 1995, 1997, and 2004. She completed an MFA from the School of Visual Arts in New York City in 2003.

Personal life 
Jones lives in Brooklyn, New York.

Bibliography

Solo projects 
 Mixed Signals (self-published one-shot, 2006)
 Isadora Duncan: a Graphic Biography (Hill & Wang, 2008) 
 Race to Incarcerate: A Graphic Retelling (The New Press, 2013)  — adaptation of Marc Mauer's book
 Our Lady of Birth Control: A Cartoonist's Encounter with Margaret Sanger (Soft Skull Press, 2016)

Anthologies
 World War 3 Illustrated (many issues, 1984–2004) — regular contributor, occasional editor
 Real Girl #4 (Fantagraphics, Sept. 1992) — contributor; edited by Angela Bocage
 GirlTalk (4 issues, Fantagraphics, 1995–1996) — co-editor and contributor 
 Wobblies! A Graphic History of the Industrial Workers of the World (Verso Books, 2005)  — contributing cartoonist; edited by Paul Buhle and Nicole Schulman
 Nature Comics #3 (Nature, 2008) — contributed the story "Good Wolf / Bad Wolf"
 The Real Cost of Prisons Comix (PM Press, 2008)  — contributed the story "Prisoners of the War on Drugs"

Illustrator 
 FDR for Beginners (For Beginners, 2010)  — with writer Paul Buhle
 Radical Jesus: A Graphic History of Faith (Herald Press, 2013)  — illustrated the cover as well as the section "Radical Gospel;" with writer Paul Buhle

Further reading 
 Robbins, Trina. A Century of Women Cartoonists (Northampton, Mass.: Kitchen Sink Press, 1993)
 Robbins, Trina. ''From Girls to Grrrlz: a History of [Female] Comics from Teens to Zines (San Francisco: Chronicle Books, 1999)

References

External links 
 

1960 births
American artists
American female comics artists
Artists from Philadelphia
Living people
MacDowell Colony fellows
School of Visual Arts alumni